Tayakadın can refer to:

 Tayakadın, Arnavutköy
 Tayakadın, Edirne